Warren William Brandt  (July 11, 1923 – July 4, 2017) was an American academic. He was the first president of Virginia Commonwealth University, serving from 1969 to 1974.

References

1923 births
2017 deaths
Michigan State University alumni
Virginia Commonwealth University administrators
People from Lansing, Michigan